Racinaea rothschuhiana is a plant species in the genus Racinaea. This species is native to southern Mexico and Central America.

References

rothschuhiana
Flora of Costa Rica